Lead(II) acetate, also known as lead acetate, lead diacetate, plumbous acetate, sugar of lead, lead sugar, salt of Saturn, or Goulard's powder, is a white crystalline chemical compound with a slightly sweet taste. Like many other lead compounds, it is toxic. Lead acetate is soluble in water and glycerin. With water it forms the trihydrate, a colourless or white efflorescent monoclinic crystalline substance.

The substance is used as a reagent to make other lead compounds and as a fixative for some dyes. In low concentrations, it is the principal active ingredient in progressive types of hair colouring dyes. Lead(II) acetate is also used as a mordant in textile printing and dyeing, and as a drier in paints and varnishes. It was historically used as a sweetener and preservative in wines and in other foods and for cosmetics.

Production
Lead(II) acetate can be made by boiling elemental lead in acetic acid and hydrogen peroxide. This method will also work with lead(II) carbonate or lead(II) oxide.

Lead(II) acetate can also be made by dissolving lead(II) oxide in acetic acid:

Lead(II) acetate can also be made via a single displacement reaction between copper acetate and lead metal:

Structure
The crystal structure of anhydrous lead(II) acetate has been described as coordination polymer. In comparison, lead(II) acetate trihydrate's structure is a 1D coordination polymer. In the trihydrate, the Pb2+ ion's coordination sphere consists of nine oxygen atoms belonging to three water molecules, two bidentate acetate groups and two bridging acetate groups. The coordination geometry at Pb is a monocapped square antiprism. The trihydrate thermally decomposes to a hemihydrate, Pb(OAc)2·H2O, and to basic acetates such as Pb4O(OAc)6 and Pb2O(OAc)2.

Uses

Sweetener
Like other lead(II) salts, lead(II) acetate has a sweet taste, which led to its historical use as a sugar substitute in both wines and foods.
The ancient Romans, who had few sweeteners besides honey, would boil must (unfiltered grape juice) in lead pots to produce a reduced sugar syrup called defrutum, concentrated again into sapa. This syrup was used to sweeten wine and to sweeten and preserve fruit. It is possible that lead(II) acetate or other lead compounds leaching into the syrup might have caused lead poisoning in those who consumed it. Lead acetate is no longer used in the production of sweeteners because of its recognized toxicity. Modern chemistry can easily detect it, which served to virtually eradicate its use as a sweetener after legislation prohibiting its use in this way had come into effect decades earlier but had failed to put an end to its continued illegal use as a sweetener.

Historical incidents
The earliest confirmed poisoning by lead acetate was that of Pope Clement II who died in October 1047. A toxicological examination of his remains conducted in the mid-20th century confirmed centuries-old rumors that he had been poisoned with lead sugar. It is not clear whether he was assassinated.

His recovery from this poison was slow and incomplete. He lived with illnesses until his death in 1822.

Although the use of lead(II) acetate as a sweetener was already illegal at that time, composer Ludwig van Beethoven may have died of lead poisoning caused by wines adulterated with lead acetate (see also Beethoven's liver).

In the 1850s, Mary Seacole applied lead(II) acetate, among other remedies, against an epidemic of cholera in Panama.

In 1887, 38 hunting horses belonging to Captain William Hollwey Steeds were poisoned in their stables at Clonsilla House, Dublin, Ireland. At least ten of the hunters died. Captain Steeds, an "extensive commission agent", had previously supplied the horses for the Bray and Greystones Coach. It transpired that they had been fed a bran mash that had been sweetened with a toxic lead acetate.

Cosmetics
Lead(II) acetate, as well as white lead, has been used in cosmetics throughout history.

Until recently, it was still used in the USA in men's hair colouring products like Grecian Formula. It was not until just a few years ago when the manufacturer removed lead acetate from the hair coloring product. Lead acetate has been replaced by bismuth citrate as the progressive colorant. Its use in cosmetics has been banned in Canada by Health Canada in 2005 (effective at the end of 2006) based on tests showing possible carcinogenicity and reproductive toxicity, and it is also banned in the European Union and has been on the California Proposition 65 warning list as a carcinogen since 1988.

Medical uses
Lead(II) acetate solution was a commonly used folk remedy for sore nipples. In modern medicine, for a time, it was used as an astringent, in the form of Goulard's extract, and it has also been used to treat poison ivy.

Industrial uses
Lead(II) acetate paper is used to detect the poisonous gas hydrogen sulfide. The gas reacts with lead(II) acetate on the moistened test paper to form a grey precipitate of lead(II) sulfide.

An aqueous solution of lead(II) acetate is the byproduct of a 1:1 ratio of hydrogen peroxide and white vinegar (acetic acid) used in the cleaning and maintenance of stainless steel firearm suppressors (silencers) and compensators. The solution is agitated by the bubbling action of the hydrogen peroxide, with the main reaction being the oxidation of lead by hydrogen peroxide and subsequent dissolution of lead oxide by the acetic acid, which forms lead acetate. Because of its high toxicity, this chemical solution must be appropriately disposed by a chemical processing facility or hazardous materials centre. Alternatively, the solution may be reacted with sulfuric acid to precipitate nearly insoluble lead(II) sulfate. The solid may then be removed by mechanical filtration and is safer to dispose of than aqueous lead acetate.

Other uses
It was also used in making of slow matches during the Middle Ages. It was made by mixing natural form of lead(II) oxide called litharge and vinegar.

Sugar of lead was a recommended agent added to linseed oil during heating to produce "boiled" linseed oil, the lead and heat acting to cause the oil to cure faster than raw linseed oil.

Lead(II) acetate ("salt of Saturn") was used to synthesise acetone which was then known as "spirit of Saturn" for being made with the salt of Saturn and thought to be a lead compound in the 17th century.

See also
 Saturn's Tree

References

External links

 Case Studies in Environmental Medicine - Lead Toxicity
 Essay on "Lead Poisoning and Rome"
 HowStuffWorks "What Kind of Hair Color Do Men Use?" discussion of progressive dyes containing lead acetate
 National Pollutant Inventory - Lead and Lead Compounds Fact sheet (Does Not Bring Up Lead)
 ToxFAQs: Lead
 US Food and Drug Administration (FDA) fact sheet "Lead Acetate in Hair Dye Products"
 US Food and Drug Administration (FDA)21CFR73.2396 "PART 73 -- LISTING OF COLOR ADDITIVES EXEMPT FROM CERTIFICATION, Subpart C--Cosmetics, Sec. 73.2396 Lead acetate"

Acetates
Alchemical substances
Lead(II) compounds
Sugar substitutes